Kafīlur Rahmān Nishāt Usmānī (5 March 1942 – 1 August 2006) was an Indian Muslim scholar, jurist, and a poet who served as a Mufti of Darul Uloom Deoband. He was the grandson of Azizur Rahman Usmani. He was an alumnus of Darul Uloom Deoband and the Aligarh Muslim University. He translated Fatawa 'Alamgiri into the Urdu language and issued more than fifty thousand religious edicts.

Biography
Kafīlur Rahmān Nishāt Usmānī was born into the Usmani family of Deoband on 5 March 1942. His father was Jalilur Rahmān Usmānī, one of the sons of Azizur Rahman Usmani and a teacher of "tajwid" and "qirat" in the Darul Uloom Deoband.

Usmānī graduated from Darul Uloom Deoband in 1961 and received an M.A in Arabic from the Aligarh Muslim University in 1975. His teachers include Syed Fakhruddin Ahmad and Muhammad Tayyib Qasmi.
In 1392 AH, Usmāni was appointed as a Mufti in the Darul Uloom Deoband. He served in this role for 32 years, during which time he issued more than fifty thousand religious edicts. He was also a poet and wrote in the ghazal, hamd, naat, nazm, marsiya, and qasīda genres of Urdu poetry.

Usmānī died on 1 August 2006 and was buried in Qasmi cemetery next to the grave of his grandfather Azizur Rahman Usmani. His funeral prayer was led by his elder brother Fuzailur Rahman Hilal Usmani.

Literary works
Usmānī wrote books including his poetic collection, Shanāsa, Ziyārat-e-Quboor, Hayāt Ibn Abbās, Hayāt Salmān Fārsi, Hayāt Abu Hurairah , Sirāj al-Īdāh (Urdu commentary to Hasan Shurunbulali's Nur ul Idāh) and Ā'īna-e-Bid'at.

Usmānī translated and annotated number of books concerning "dars-e-nizami" from Arabic and Persian into the Urdu language. The Arabic-Urdu translations include Sirāj al-Ma'āni, Sirāj al-Wiqāya (Urdu translation and commentary to Sharh-ul-Wiqāya), Sirāj al-Matālib, Tafhīm al-Muslim (Urdu translation and commentary to Shabbir Ahmad Usmani's Fath al-Mulhim), and Fatawa 'Alamgiri. The Persian-Urdu translations include Gulzār-e-Dabistān, Tuhfat al-Muwahhidīn, Masā'il Arba'īn, and Rubāʿiyāt of Baha' al-Din Naqshband.

References

Citations

Bibliography
 

 

1942 births
2006 deaths
Darul Uloom Deoband alumni
Aligarh Muslim University alumni
Academic staff of Darul Uloom Deoband
Urdu-language poets
Usmani family
Burials at Mazar-e-Qasmi